Żar is a mountain in the mountain range of Little Beskids in southern Poland, 761 m above the sea level.

Below the mountain is an artificial lake (the Międzybrodzkie lake) that was created by damming the Soła river.

Zar power plant

A  pumped-storage hydroelectricity power plant is located on the top of this mountain. It can contain  of water. The power plant was completed in 1979. The pumping time is about 5.5 hours, the power-generation time is about 4 h. The efficiency of the pumping-generation cycle is about 75%. The plant is opened to visitors.

Notes

Mountains of Poland
Żywiec County